Kekar is a village in the Barmer district of Rajasthan state of India. Distance from district headquarters is 95 km.

Villages in Barmer district